Kamala Laxman was an Indian author of children's books, and the wife of cartoonist R. K. Laxman. Kamala died in 2015 at the age of 90. She is survived by her son Srinivas, a retired journalist, her daughter-in-law Usha and granddaughter Rimanika.

Early life and career 
Kamala was born in Chennai and studied in St Thomas' Convent and later graduated from Indraprastha College for Women, Delhi. She also received a degree in Interior Decoration from Sir J.J. School of Art in Mumbai.

Recognising her talent, the India Book House commissioned Kamala to write children's books in the 1970s. Her notable works include The Thama Stories, Raman of Tenali & Other Stories and Thama and His Missing Mother. Many of her works were illustrated by her husband R. K. Laxman. Their stories were serialised and telecasted by the Indian TV station Doordarshan.

Personal life 
She was married to cartoonist R. K. Laxman, who also happened to be her maternal uncle, after his divorce to his first wife Kumari Kamala. Kamala was the life president of Mahalakshmi Ladies' Club founded by her mother in the year 1965 in Mumbai.

References

2015 deaths
Indian children's writers
Sir Jamsetjee Jeejebhoy School of Art alumni
Writers from Pune
Writers from Chennai
Indraprastha College for Women alumni
Indian women children's writers
Women writers from Tamil Nadu
20th-century Indian women writers
20th-century Indian novelists